Ricardo Gallego Redondo (born 8 February 1959 in Madrid) is a Spanish retired footballer who played as a defensive midfielder.

Most of his professional career was associated to Real Madrid, for which he appeared in more than 300 official games in nearly ten years, winning a total of ten major titles. 

Gallego gained almost 45 caps for Spain, representing the nation in two World Cups and as many European Championships.

His nickname was "El soso" (The insipid)

Club career
A product of La Liga powerhouse Real Madrid's youth system, Gallego made a quick impression with the first team, appearing in 26 matches in his debut year and being a midfield mainstay during the subsequent seasons as he totalled 250 first division matches with the conquest of, among others, four leagues, two Spanish cups and back-to-back UEFA Cups (1985–86); blessed with physical and technical ability alike, he could operate with equal efficiency as sweeper.

In the 1986–87 campaign, Gallego contributed with 37 games and two goals (more than 3,000 minutes of play) as Real Madrid won the national championship, also reaching the semifinals of the domestic cup. On 15 March 1987, however, he unluckily landed on Miguel de Andrés' knee, and the Athletic Bilbao player ended his career after that game, a 2–1 win at the San Mamés Stadium.

After a brief spell with Italy's Udinese Calcio, Gallego returned to Spain and Madrid, playing two seasons with Rayo Vallecano in the second division and contributing with 31 matches in his second and last, for an eventual promotion. Retiring at 33, he then worked with his last club in directorial capacities.

International career
Gallego played 42 times for Spain, his debut coming in a preparation match for the impending FIFA World Cup on home soil, a 24 February 1982 win with Scotland: after replacing FC Barcelona's Víctor Muñoz in the second half, he closed the score at 3–0.

After being used only once during that World Cup, Gallego turned into an essential defensive element in the following two competitions: UEFA Euro 1984 (a runner-up finish) and the 1986 FIFA World Cup, retiring from international play after Euro 88. In mid-August 2011 he reunited with former Spain and Real Madrid teammate José Antonio Camacho, acting as his assistant in the China national team.

International goals

Honours
Real Madrid
La Liga: 1985–86, 1986–87, 1987–88, 1988–89
Copa del Rey: 1981–82, 1988–89
Supercopa de España: 1988
Copa de la Liga: 1985
UEFA Cup: 1984–85, 1985–86

Castilla
Copa del Rey: Runner-up 1979–80

References

External links

Biography at Real Madrid Fans 

1959 births
Living people
Footballers from Madrid
Spanish footballers
Association football midfielders
La Liga players
Segunda División players
Real Madrid Castilla footballers
Real Madrid CF players
Rayo Vallecano players
Serie A players
Udinese Calcio players
Spain youth international footballers
Spain under-21 international footballers
Spain B international footballers
Spain international footballers
1982 FIFA World Cup players
UEFA Euro 1984 players
1986 FIFA World Cup players
UEFA Euro 1988 players
Spanish expatriate footballers
Expatriate footballers in Italy
UEFA Cup winning players